Patrick Etolu (17 March 1935 – 24 December 2013) was a Ugandan high jumper. He was born in Soroti District, Eastern Region, Uganda. He won the high jump at the 1953 Central African Games.

In doing so, he became the first athlete to win a medal for Uganda at the Commonwealth Games. Two years later in November 1956 in Bombay, Etolu cleared . This set a national record which stood until May 1999. One month later he was part of the maiden Ugandan team that competed at the 1956 Summer Olympics.

Etolu died on 24 December 2013 in Mulago Hospital at the age of 78 after being admitted with breathing difficulties and swollen legs. He is survived by his wife and six children.

References

1935 births
2013 deaths
People from Eastern Region, Uganda
Male high jumpers
Ugandan high jumpers
Ugandan male athletes
Olympic male high jumpers
Olympic athletes of Uganda
Athletes (track and field) at the 1956 Summer Olympics
Commonwealth Games medallists in athletics
Commonwealth Games silver medallists for Uganda
Athletes (track and field) at the 1954 British Empire and Commonwealth Games
Athletes (track and field) at the 1958 British Empire and Commonwealth Games
Athletes (track and field) at the 1962 British Empire and Commonwealth Games
20th-century Ugandan people
21st-century Ugandan people
Medallists at the 1954 British Empire and Commonwealth Games